|}

The Prix Jean Prat is a Group 1 flat horse race in France open to three-year-old thoroughbred colts and fillies. It is run at Deauville over a distance of 1,400 metres (about 7 furlongs), and it is scheduled to take place each year in early July.

History
The event was established in 1858. It was originally the opening leg of a two-part series called the Prix Biennal. The second leg, for horses aged four or older, was first run in 1859. Both races were staged at Longchamp.

The three-year-olds' division of the Prix Biennal was run over 2,000 metres. For a period it was held in April, and it served as a trial for the Prix du Jockey Club.

Both Prix Biennal races were renamed the Prix Jean Prat in 1940. This was in memory of Jean Prat (1847–1940), a successful racehorse owner and breeder.

The version for three-year-olds was switched to late May or early June in 1961. It was shortened to 1,850 metres in 1962. It was transferred to Chantilly and cut to 1,800 metres in 1967. The present system of race grading was introduced in 1971, and for several years the event held Group 2 status.

The race was promoted to Group 1 level in 1985. From this point the version for older horses was known as the Prix Vicomtesse Vigier. The Prix Jean Prat returned to Longchamp in 1986.

The event returned to Chantilly in 1995, and was cut to 1,600 metres and moved to early July in 2005. The distance was further reduced to 1,400 metres in 2019 and the event was moved to a new home at Deauville.

Records
Leading jockey since 1940 (6 wins):
 Yves Saint-Martin – Jour et Nuit (1964), Silver Shark (1966), Antipode (1974), Earth Spirit (1976), Melyno (1982), Ginger Brink (1983)

Leading trainer since 1940 (5 wins):
 François Mathet – Jour et Nuit (1964), Silver Shark (1966), Maroun (1971), Lightning (1977), Melyno (1982)
 François Boutin – Speedy Dakota (1975), Cresta Rider (1981), Mendez (1984), Baillamont (1985), Priolo (1990)
 André Fabre - Local Talent (1989), Kitwood (1992), Mutual Trust (2011), Aesop's Fables (2012), Territories (2015)

Leading owner since 1940 (5 wins):
 Godolphin – Almutawakel (1998), Aesop's Fables (2012), Territories (2015), Thunder Snow (2017), Pinatubo (2020)

Winners since 1977

Earlier winners

 1867: Nemea
 1868: Mortemer
 1870: Sornette
 1872: Revigny
 1874: Bieville
 1875: My Emmy
 1876: Le Drole
 1877: Boiador
 1878: Clocher
 1879: Fido
 1880: Beauminet
 1881: Vizir
 1883: Satory
 1884: Little Duck
 1885: Reluisant
 1886: Alger
 1887: Cherie
 1888: St. Gall
 1889: Tire-Larigot
 1890: Yellow
 1892: Diarbek
 1893: Preux
 1894: Polygone
 1895: Launay
 1896: Arreau
 1897: Valparaiso
 1898: Madrid
 1899: Holocauste
 1900: Codoman
 1901: Grand Pont
 1902: Bahr Yousouf
 1903: Caius
 1904: Fifre
 1905: Genial
 1906: Prestige
 1907: Calomel
 1908: Sea Sick
 1909: Verdun
 1911: Rubinat
 1914: Durbar
 1920: Odol
 1921: Grazing
 1922: Mazeppa
 1923: São Paulo
 1924: Le Gros Morne
 1925: Coram
 1926: Diplomate
 1927: Flamant
 1928: Kantar
 1929: Arbaletrier
 1930: Le Tourbillon
 1931: Roi de Trefle
 1932: Macaroni
 1933: Le Cacique
 1934: Duplex
 1935: Le Gazon
 1936: Vatellor
 1937: Galloway
 1938: Canot
 1939: Galerien
 1940: Corviglia
 1941: La Barca
 1942: Puymirol
 1943: Dogat
 1944: Laborde
 1945: Obelisque
 1946: Souverain
 1947: L'Imperial
 1948: Jocker
 1949: Marveil
 1950: Janus
 1951: Le Tyrol
 1952: La Varende
 1954: Peppermint
 1955: Fauchelevent
 1956: Incitatus
 1957: Le Haar
 1958: Launay
 1959: Memorandum
 1960: Angers
 1961: Bobar
 1962: Tang
 1963: Spy Well
 1964: Jour et Nuit
 1965: Esso
 1966: Silver Shark
 1967: Locris
 1968: Lorenzaccio
 1969: Hill Run
 1970: Master Guy
 1971: Maroun
 1972: Riverman
 1973: Sharp Edge
 1974: Antipode
 1975: Speedy Dakota
 1976: Earth Spirit
</div>

See also
 List of French flat horse races
 Recurring sporting events established in 1858 – this race is included under its original title, Prix Biennal.

References

 France Galop / Racing Post:
 galop.courses-france.com:
 1940–1949, 1950–1979, 1980–present
 france-galop.com – A Brief History: Prix Jean Prat.
 galopp-sieger.de – Prix Jean Prat (ex Prix Biennal).
 horseracingintfed.com – International Federation of Horseracing Authorities – Prix Jean Prat (2017).
 pedigreequery.com – Prix Jean Prat – Chantilly.

Flat horse races for three-year-olds
Chantilly Racecourse
Horse races in France
Recurring sporting events established in 1858
1858 establishments in France
Deauville-La Touques Racecourse